Hoogland is a Dutch toponymic surname meaning "high land". It could have referred to the town Hoogland in Utrecht province or to any elevated land. People with this surname include:

Cornelia Hoogland (born 1952), Canadian poet
Duco Hoogland (born 1984), Dutch politician
Herman Hoogland (1891–1955), Dutch drafts player
Jeffrey Hoogland (born 1993), Dutch track cyclist
Monique Hoogland (born 1967), Dutch badminton player
Ruurd Dirk Hoogland (1922–1994), Dutch explorer and botanist
Tim Hoogland (born 1985), German footballer 
William Hoogland (ca.1794–1832), American engraver

See also
Hoagland
Zeke Hogeland

References

Dutch-language surnames